Francesco De Lorenzo (born June 5, 1938 in Naples) is a physician and politician, member of the Italian Liberal Party. He was born in Naples. He was minister of health (1989–1993) in the Government of Italy. He served in the cabinet of Prime Minister Bettino Craxi (1986–1987), Giulio Andreotti (1989–1992) and Giuliano Amato (1992–1993). He served in the Chamber of Deputies of Italy in Legislature IX (1983–1987), Legislature X (1987–1992) and Legislature XI (1992–1994).

He was a central figure in the Tangentopoli bribery scandal uncovered by the Mani pulite investigations of the early 1990s.

Publications
 Givol, D., De Lorenzo, F., Goldberger, R.F. and Anfinsen, C.B. Disulfide interchange and the three-dimensional structure of proteins. Proc. NatI. Acad. Sci. U.S.A., 53, 676, 1965
 Steiner, RF., De Lorenzo, F. and Anfinsen, C.B. Enzymically catalyzed disulfide interchange in randomly crosslinked soybean trypsin inhibitor. J. Biol. Chem., 240, 4648, 1965
 De Lorenzo, F., Goldberger, RF., Steers, E., Givol, D. and Anfinsen, C.B. Purification and properties of an enzyme from beef liver which catalyzes sulfhydryl-disulfide interchange in proteins . J. Biol. Chem., 241,1562,1966
 De Lorenzo, F., Fuchs, S. and Anfinsen, C.B. Characterization of a peptide fragment containing the essential half-cystine residue af a microsomal disulfide interchange enzyme'''. Biochem., 5, 3961, 1966
 Givol, D. and De Lorenzo, F. The position of various cleavages of rabbit Immunoglobulin. G. J. Biol. Chem., 243, 1886, 1966
 De Lorenzo, F. and Ames, B.N. Histidine regulation in Salmonella typhimurium. VII. Purification and general properties of the histidine transfer ribonucleic acid synthetase. J. Biol. Chem., 245, 1710, 1970
 De Lorenzo, F., Straus, D. and Ames, B.N. Histidine regulation in Salmonella typhimurium. IX. Kinetic studies of mutant histidyl-tRNA synthetases. J. Biol. Chem., 247,2302, 1972
 De Lorenzo, F., Silengo, L. and Cortese, R. Mutagenicity of two widely used pesticides. International Conference on Ecological Perspectives on Carcinogens and Cancer control. Cremona, Settembre 1976
 De Lorenzo, F., Degl'Innocenti, S., Ruocco, A., Silengo, L. and Cortese, R. Mutagenicity of a pesticides containing 1,3-Dichloropropene, Cancer Research, 37, 1915-1917,1977
 N. Staiano, I. Quinto and F, De Lorenzo, Il test della Salmonella per l'identificazione di mutageni chimici: relazione tra struttura chimica e proprietà mutagene. Società Italiana di Biochimica, Urbino, Ottobre 1978
 F. De Lorenzo and I. Quinto, I test di mutagenesi nella valutazione della tossicologia dei farmaci. In: "Nuovi Aspetti di Tossicologia Sperimentale e Clinica" , C.G. Edizioni Medico-Scientifiche, Torino, 1979, pp 33–49
 Martire, G., Vricella, G., Perfumo, A.M. and De Lorenzo, F. "Evaluation of the Mutagenic of Coded Compounds in the Salmonella/Microsome Test. In: "Evolution of short-term tests for carcinogens International Collaborative Program" . Progress in Mutation Research, vol. I, pp 271-279, 1981.
 I. Quinto, G. Martire, G. Vricella, F. Riccardi, A. Perfumo, R, Giulivo and F. De Lorenzo. Screening of 24 pesticides by the Salmonella/microsome assay: mutagenicity of Benazolin, Metoxuron and Paraoxon. X Annual Meeting of the European Environmental Mutagen Society (EEMS), September 1980, Athens, Greece. Abstract published in: Mutation Res. 85, 265,1981
 I. Quinto, G. Scal, M. Mallardo, M.R. Ruocco and F. De Lorenzo. Spontaneous or mutagen-mediated expression of a promoterless neo gene integrated al different genomic sites of Rat 2 fibroblasts. Atti del UCLA Symposia on Molecular and Cellular Biology "Genomic Instability and Cancer", Febbraio 1991, Tamarron, Colorado, USA, estratto n. J129. Estratto pubblicato in: J. Celi. Biochem., Suppl. 15D, 107, 1991
 M. Sanchez, E. Gionti, G. Pontarelli, A. Arcella and F. De Lorenzo. Regulatation of α2-collagen gene expression in retinoic acid treated quail chondrocytes. Biochemical J., 295, 115-119, 1993

References

External links
 
 
 
 

1938 births
Living people
Physicians from Naples
Italian Liberal Party politicians
Government ministers of Italy
Italian Ministers of Health
Deputies of Legislature IX of Italy
Deputies of Legislature X of Italy
Deputies of Legislature XI of Italy
Politicians from Naples
Italian biochemists